Pauline Karpidas  (born Manchester) is an English contemporary art collector, private art space benefactor, socialite, and patron of the arts.

Karpidas was married to Constantine Karpidas a Greek shipping magnate. She was introduced to contemporary art by Athens art dealer Alexander Iolas in 1975.

In 2009, she auctioned the Andy Warhol painting 200 One Dollar Bills, which she had bought with her late husband Constantine Karpidas. Characterizing the 1962 painting, art dealer Tony Shafrazi said, "We’ve seen nothing like this recently [come to auction], this is a masterpiece." The Karpidases paid $385,000 for the painting at a 1986 Sotheby's sale. After a dramatic "bidding war" the painting realized $43.8 million. Karpidas made more than 100 times what had been paid in 1986.

Karpidas is a patron of young artists whose work she displays at her workshop gallery on Hydra, Greece. Each Summer, since 1999 the London-based collector hosts over 100 guests on the Greek island of Hydra to view the latest additions to her Ophiuchus Collection on display at her Hydra Workshop.

She is a benefactor of the Tate and the Sir John Soane Museum in London, and an education centre at New York's New Museum is named after her and her late husband—The Pauline and Constantine Karpidas Education Center. In a 2007 interview with journalist Marina Fokidis, Karpidas said of her Hydra Gallery, Having lived now for almost 35 years in Greece, and having been part of the Greek heritage through my marriage to my late husband, Constantine Karpidas, this is a way for me to continue his legacy, his involvement with and support of the arts.

In 2008, Karpidas has presented the work many artists at her Hydra Workshop in Hydra, Greece, including Urs Fischer (2007), Carroll Dunham (2008), Nate Lowman (2010) and Ryan Sullivan (2013).

In 2012, Karpidas donated a vast sum of money to the University of Manchester, particularly to the 
Manchester Access Programme. This includes the prestigious Karpidas Excellence Scholarship.

References

Literature
 Coles, Sadie & Karpidas, Pauline (ed.) Package Holiday: New British Art in the Ophiuchus Collection (1997) Works by Damien Hirst, Tracey Emin, Sam Taylor-Wood, Gary Hume, Angus Fairhurst, Paul Noble, Sarah Lucas, Don Brown, Chris Ofili, Richard Patterson, Peter Doig

British socialites
English art collectors
Living people
Philanthropists from Greater Manchester
Year of birth missing (living people)